Sydney Graver Etheridge (3 November 1882 – 3 September 1945) was an English first-class cricketer active 1908–10 who played for Middlesex. He was born in Cockfosters; died in Barnet.

References

1882 births
1945 deaths
English cricketers
Middlesex cricketers
Hertfordshire cricketers